Disc Description Protocol (DDP) is a format for specifying the content of optical discs, including CDs and DVDs.

DDP is commonly used for delivery of disc premasters for duplication. DDP is a proprietary format and is the property of DCA. The file format specification is not freely available.

The DDP must contain 4 parts:
 Audio image(s) (.DAT file(s))
 DDP Identifier (DDPID)
 DDP Stream descriptor (DDPMS)
 Subcode descriptor (PQDESCR) 

An optional text file, containing the track titles and timings, can also be included.

Software

Windows PC:
Adobe Encore
Cockos Reaper
DCA Viper
Eclipse Image Encoder
Gear Pro Mastering
HOFA CD Burn & DDP
Magix Sequoia
Merging Pyramix
PreSonus Studio One Professional
SADiE
Sonoris DDP Creator
Steinberg WaveLab

macOS:
Triumph Mastering Suite
Adobe Encore×
Audiofile Engineering Triumph (previously Wave Editor)
Audiofile Triumph
Cockos Reaper
DSP-Quattro
HOFA CD Burn & DDP
PreSonus Studio One Professional
Sonic Studio soundBlade and PMCD
Sonoris DDP Creator for Mac
Steinberg WaveLab

References 

Optical disc authoring